The 1992 All-Ireland Under-21 Hurling Championship was the 29th staging of the All-Ireland Under-21 Hurling Championship since its establishment by the Gaelic Athletic Association in 1964. The championship began on 8 May 1992 and ended on 27 September 1992.

Galway were the defending champions, however, they were beaten by Offaly in the All-Ireland semi-final.

On 27 September 1992, Waterford won the championship following a 0-12 to 2-3 defeat of Offaly in a replay of the All-Ireland final. This was their first All-Ireland title in the under-21 grade.

Offaly's Johnny Dooley was the championship's top scorer with 0-38.

Results

Leinster Under-21 Hurling Championship

Quarter-finals

Semi-finals

Final

Munster Under-21 Hurling Championship

Quarter-finals

Semi-finals

Final

Ulster Under-21 Hurling Championship

Semi-finals

Final

All-Ireland Under-21 Hurling Championship

Semi-finals

Finals

Championship statistics

Top scorers

Overall

Miscellaneous

 Waterford won the Munster Championship for only the second time in their history. It was their first provincial triumph since 1974.
 The All-Ireland final was the first championship meeting of Offaly and Waterford. It is also the first drawn final since 1978.

References

Under
All-Ireland Under-21 Hurling Championship